The Czech Republic national badminton team represents Czech Republic in international badminton team competitions. The Czech team competed in the 1991 Sudirman Cup under the Czechoslovakia national badminton team merged with Slovakia. The national team was formed after the dissolution of Czechoslovakia in 1992 and the Czech Republic and Slovakia were separated into two different national teams.

The Czech Badminton Federation is the governing body that controls the national team.

Participation in BWF competitions

Sudirman Cup

Participation in European Team Badminton Championships

Men's Team

Women's Team

Mixed Team

Participation in Helvetia Cup

Participation in European Junior Team Badminton Championships
Mixed Team

Current squad 
The following players were selected to represent the Czech Republic at the 2020 European Men's and Women's Team Badminton Championships.

Male players
Milan Ludik
Adam Mendrek
Jan Louda
Ondřej Král
Jaromír Janáček
Tomáš Švejda
Matěj Hubáček
Vít Kulíšek
Jakub Bitman
Jiří Král
Jan Janoštík

Female players
Alžběta Bášová
Kateřina Tomalová
Tereza Švábíková
Sabina Milová
Kateřina Mikelová
Tallulah Sharleen van Coppenolle
Michaela Fuchsová
Lucie Krpatová
Tereza Kobyláková
Kateřina Zuzáková

References

Badminton
National badminton teams
Badminton in the Czech Republic